Amu-Aa (eater of the ass) or (eater of the phallus), is one of the gods that goes with Osiris during the second hour of the night.

Amu-Aa would eat the bread made for the boat and use the perfume.

Notes

References 

Egyptian gods
Osiris